WTO or World Trade Organization is an organization that intends to supervise and liberalize international trade.

WTO may also refer to:
Warsaw Treaty Organization or Warsaw Pact
World Toilet Organization, a non-profit organisation based in Singapore
World Tourism Organization
WTO (Deus Ex), a fictional organization in Deus Ex: Invisible War
"WTO", a song by Pennywise from Land of the Free?